Harry Keggans (4 December 1887 – 20 August 1949) was a Scottish professional footballer who played as an inside right.

Keggans was born in Cambuslang, Lanarkshire to Henry Keggans and Elizabeth McSephney Keggans, and moved to New Cumnock, Ayrshire shortly afterward. Keggans signed for Bradford City in October 1911 from Sanquhar, leaving the club in August 1912 to play  for Cardiff City. During his time with Bradford City he made one appearance in the Football League.

He died of coronary thrombosis in 1949.

Sources

References

1887 births
1949 deaths
Scottish footballers
Bradford City A.F.C. players
Cardiff City F.C. players
English Football League players
Association football inside forwards
Deaths from coronary thrombosis